Bethel AME Church and Manse is a historic African Methodist Episcopal church and manse at 291 Park Avenue in Huntington, Suffolk County, New York. The church was built about 1845 and is a -story, wood-frame structure that is rectangular in plan with a gable roof and clapboard exterior.  The manse was built in 1915 and is a 2-story, wood-frame structure, with a two-by-two-bay square plan.

It was added to the National Register of Historic Places in 1985.

References

Churches on the National Register of Historic Places in New York (state)
Churches completed in 1845
19th-century Episcopal church buildings
African Methodist Episcopal churches in New York (state)
Churches in Suffolk County, New York
National Register of Historic Places in Huntington (town), New York